Arne Tellefsen (13 February 1891 – 23 December 1973) was a Norwegian modern pentathlete. He competed at the 1920 Summer Olympics.

References

External links
 

1891 births
1973 deaths
Norwegian male modern pentathletes
Olympic modern pentathletes of Norway
Modern pentathletes at the 1920 Summer Olympics
Sportspeople from Oslo